The Amarna letter EA1 is part of an archive of clay tablets containing the diplomatic correspondence between Egypt and other Near Eastern rulers during the reign of Pharaoh Akhenaten, his predecessor Amenhotep III and his successors. These tablets were discovered in el-Amarna and are therefore known as the Amarna letters. All of the tablets are inscribed with cuneiform writing.

The letters EA1 to EA14 contain the correspondence between Egypt and Babylonia. Only two of them, EA1 and EA5, were sent from Egypt to Babylonia. The other twelve were written by Babylonians.

The letter

The letter, also titled The Pharaoh complains to the Babylonian King, was written by the Pharaoh Amenhotep III to the King Kadašman-Enlil I.
The tablet itself is made of Marl found near Esna.

Transliterations and translations were made by Rainey (1989-1990 and 1995 to 1996) and Cochavi-Rainey (1993) and translations were made by Moran (1992) and Liverani (1999).

Translation
The letter includes the information:

The letter in its entirety is translated as (text in italics, apart from the address, is taken from the Moran translation, plain text from the Rainey):

See also
Amarna
Amarna letters: EA 2, EA 3, EA 4, EA 5, EA 6, EA 7, EA 8, EA 9, EA 10, EA 11
Amon
Chronology of the ancient Near East
Written communication and its historical development
Karduniaš
Zaqara

References

Amarna letters